Henry Westmoreland is a retired American soccer goalkeeper who played professionally in the Major Indoor Soccer League.

Westmoreland attended Florida International University, playing on the men’s soccer team in 1979 and 1980.  In 1980, he turned professional with the Phoenix Inferno of the Major Indoor Soccer League.  He spent two seasons with the Inferno.  He later coached the Florida State University School Girls' & Boys' soccer team.

References

External links
 MISL stats

Living people
1958 births
American soccer players
FIU Panthers men's soccer players
Major Indoor Soccer League (1978–1992) players
Phoenix Inferno players
Association football goalkeepers